Björn Hellkvist (born 3 January 1977) is a former ice hockey player and coach. He is currently coaching Leksands IF of the SHL.

Career
Hellkvist played as a professional for Rögle BK and Jonstorps IF in the Swedish Division 1 and Division 2 between 1994 and 2004. He also played in the J20 SuperElit as a youth player.

As a coach Hellkvist was first active as head coach for Jonstorps IF before moving on to the youth ranks at Rögle BK. He later progressed to become assistant coach and later head coach at the same club. After a brief career pause due to suffering from Parkinson's disease Hellkvist returned to the industry to become assistant coach for Malmö Redhawks. After the 2014–15 season, Hellkvist was made head coach.

References

External links

1977 births
Living people
Swedish ice hockey forwards
Swedish ice hockey coaches
Sportspeople from Malmö
Leksands IF coaches
Swedish Hockey League coaches